The Dr. Stephen N. Chism House is a historic house in rural Logan County, Arkansas. It is a two-story log dogtrot house, with two log pens flanking an open breezeway, with a gable roof for cover. Built about 1844–45, it is believed to be the oldest log building in the county. Log Builder Paul Glidewell completed the complete restoration of the house in late 2013.

The house was listed on the National Register of Historic Places in 1994.

See also
National Register of Historic Places listings in Logan County, Arkansas

References

Houses on the National Register of Historic Places in Arkansas
National Register of Historic Places in Logan County, Arkansas
Houses completed in 1844
Houses in Logan County, Arkansas
Buildings and structures in Booneville, Arkansas